Flavio Cipolla and Simone Vagnozzi were the defenders of championship title, but Cipolla decided to not participate this year.
Vagnozzi chose to play with Leonardo Azzaro, however they lost to James Cerretani and Amir Hadad in the first round.
Simon Greul and Christopher Kas won in the final 4–6, 7–6(2), [10–2], against Johan Brunström and Jean-Julien Rojer.

Seeds

Draw

Draw

References
 Doubles Draw

Roma Open - Doubles
2009 Doubles